Roland Hill (18 October 1868 – 10 January 1929) was an Australian cricketer. He played in one first-class match for South Australia in 1893/94.

See also
 List of South Australian representative cricketers

References

External links
 

1868 births
1929 deaths
Australian cricketers
South Australia cricketers
Cricketers from Adelaide